Aishwarya Lakshmi Amman Temple or kovil is located in the western province of Sri Lanka, Colombo Wellawatte.

References 

Hindu temples in Western Province, Sri Lanka